WRVD (90.3 FM) is a member-supported public radio station in Syracuse, New York. Owned by the State University of New York at Oswego, the station simulcasts the programming of WRVO in Oswego, New York.

External links
 www.wrvo.fm

RVD
NPR member stations
State University of New York at Oswego
Radio stations established in 1999
1999 establishments in New York (state)
Radio stations in Syracuse, New York